Dominus was a Danish death and groove metal band from Ringsted that formed in 1991 and split up in 2000/2001. They released one single, two demos and four albums. Though mostly known for their first two death metal albums, they moved into a groove metal direction on 1997's Vol.Beat release and would go on to fuse that sound with thrash metal and returning death metal elements on their final release, 2000's Godfallos.

When the band split up after their last album, lead singer and guitarist Michael Poulsen went on to form the band Volbeat, named after the Dominus album Vol.Beat and continuing that overall sound with a wide array of different influences. Jens Peter Storm would go on to perform lead guitar in the Danish thrash metal band TONS, a band which also featured fellow Dominus member Daniel Preisler Larsen.

Members
Michael Poulsen – vocals, guitars
Jens Peter Storm – guitars
Franz Gottschalk – bass
James Andersen – drums
Mads Hansen – guitar
Keld Buchhard – guitar
Jesper Olsen – bass
Anders Nielsen – bass
Jess Larsen – drums
Lars Hald – drums
Daniel Preisler Larsen – drums

Discography
 Ambrosius Locus (1992, demo)
 Sidereal Path of Colours (1993, EP)
 Astaroth (1993, demo)
 View to the Dim (1994, album)
 The First 9 (1996, album)
 Vol.Beat (1997, album)
 Godfallos (2000, album)

References

External links
 Band site on Diehard Music
 Encyclopaedia Metallum
 TONS a Band featuring former Dominus Members

Musical groups established in 1991
Musical groups disestablished in 2001
Danish death metal musical groups
1991 establishments in Denmark